Leontopodium nivale, commonly called edelweiss (English pronunciation ), is a mountain flower belonging to the daisy or sunflower family Asteraceae. The plant prefers rocky limestone places at about  altitude. It is non-toxic and has been used in traditional medicine as a remedy against abdominal and respiratory diseases. Its leaves and flowers are covered with dense hairs, which appear to protect the plant from cold, aridity, and ultraviolet radiation. It is a scarce, short-lived flower found in remote mountain areas and has been used as a symbol for alpinism, for rugged beauty and purity associated with the Alps and Carpathians. It is a national symbol, especially of Romania, Austria, Slovenia, Switzerland, and Italy. According to folk tradition, giving this flower to a loved one is a promise of dedication.

Names
The flower's common name Edelweiß is German, and is a compound of edel "noble" and weiß "white". Slovenian name is planika, meaning mountain girl. In Romania, it is known as floare de colț, which means 'cliffhanger's flower.' The flower is referred to as Stella Alpina in the Italian-speaking Alps and étoile des Alpes in the French Alps, meaning 'star of the Alps.'

Edelweiß was one of several regional names for the plant and achieved wide usage during the first half of the 19th century in the context of early Alpine tourism. Alternative names include Chatzen-Talpen ("cat's paws") and the older Wullbluomen ("wool flower," attested in the 16th century).

The scientific name Leontopodium is a latinisation of the Greek  leontopódion, "lion's paw". The Latin specific epithet nivale means "white".

Taxonomy
Since 1822, Leontopodium has no longer been considered part of the genus Gnaphalium, but classified alongside it as a distinct genus within the tribe Gnaphalieae. In 2003, Leontopodium alpinum was re-classified as a subspecies of Leontopodium nivale. Thus, the alpine edelweiss is currently recognized as being divided into two subspecies, Leontopodium nivale subsp. alpinum (Cass.) Greuter and Leontopodium nivale subsp. nivale.

Description
The plant's leaves and flowers are covered with white hairs, and appear woolly (tomentose). Each bloom consists of five to six small yellow clustered spikelet-florets surrounded by fuzzy white "petals" (technically, bracts) in a double-star formation. The flowers bloom between July and September.

Conservation
Leontopodium nivale is considered a least concern species by the IUCN. The population of this species declined due to overcollection, but is now protected by laws, ex situ conservation and occurrence in national parks.

Cultivation
Leontopodium nivale is grown in gardens for its interesting inflorescence and silver foliage. It grows in the end of May The plants are short lived and can be grown from seed.

Chemical constituents
Compounds of different classes, such as terpenoids, phenylpropanoids, fatty acids and polyacetylenes are reported in various parts of edelweiss plants. Leoligin was reported as the major lignan constituent.

The edelweiss has been used in traditional folk medicine in the Alps for centuries. Extracts from different parts of plants have been used to treat abdominal pain, respiratory diseases, heart disease, and against diarrhea. That is why it was also known as the bellyache flower for a long time. It was also used by the mountain people as a durable flower ("eternal flower") in dry bouquets. The cosmetics industry became aware of the plant and its extracts a few years ago.

Symbolic uses

In the 19th century, the edelweiss became a symbol of the rugged purity of the Alpine region and of its native inhabitants.

The passion for edelweiss, which had previously been neglected, began in the middle of the 19th century. The focus is on an incident from 1856, when the Austrian Emperor Franz Joseph I went on a mountain hike to the Pasterzen Glacier on the Großglockner with his wife Sisi. There the emperor picked his wife an edelweiss from the steep rock with the words "The first in my life that I picked myself". The affection for edelweiss was a common feature of the famous couple and this well-known story raised people's attention to this alpine plant.

The plant became known as a symbol of the Austrian Empress Elisabeth. A portrait by the painter Franz Xaver Winterhalter painted in 1865 shows Empress Elisabeth with nine artificial edelweiss stars braided in her hair. The jewelry made of precious metal and diamonds was designed in the years after 1850 by the then court and chamber jeweler Alexander Emanuel Köchert.

With the rise of mountain tourism at the end of the 19th century, the edelweiss became the badge and symbol of alpinists and mountaineers. In order to prevent the extinction of the often picked symbolic species, it was placed under nature protection early on. The edelweiss was soon adopted as a symbol in the logo of numerous alpine clubs and associations. In the Austro-Hungarian Army in particular, the symbolic relationship between defiant, frugal and resilient alpine plants or the required perseverance, agility and cutting edge of the alpine troops was recognized and emphasized and often promoted by badges and designations. The Alpen-Edelweiss was assigned as a badge by Emperor Franz Joseph to troops (three regiments of Kaiserschützen) of the Austro-Hungarian Army intended for use in the mountains. It was worn on the collar of the uniform skirt.

In Berthold Auerbach's novel Edelweiss (1861), the difficulty for an alpinist to acquire an edelweiss flower was exaggerated to the point of claiming: "the possession of one is a proof of unusual daring." This idea at the time was becoming part of the popular mythology of early alpinism. Auerbach's novel appeared in English translation in 1869, prefaced with a quote attributed to Ralph Waldo Emerson:

Together with the alpine gentian, the edelweiss is also a symbol of lonely peaks and pure air in the Alps today. These plants are celebrated with songs and many souvenirs related to them are sold.

Before 1914

 The edelweiss was established in 1907 as the sign of the Imperial-Royal Mountain Troops by Emperor Franz Joseph I. These original three Regiments wore their edelweiss on the collar of their uniform. Before 1918 there were also innumerable edelweiss badges in the Habsburg army. These include, for example, the military mountain guide award (ice ax with edelweiss and winding mountain rope), edelweiss emblems on the collar and cap or badges from alpine patrol companies. Many alpine units, commandos and soldiers proudly wore unofficial edelweiss badges. 
 The edelweiss also played a role in the troop designation, which also reflected the special relationship with the mountains. In addition to the "Edelweiss Corps" (k.u.k. XIV. Corps) of Archduke Joseph Ferdinand, an "Edelweiss Division" was formed in the course of the First World War. It essentially consisted of Kaiserjäger of the 3rd and 4th regiments, the Salzburg infantry regiment "Archduke Rainer" No. 59 and the Upper Austrian infantry regiment "Grand Duke of Hesse and the Rhine" No. 14. In 1915,  World War I, the edelweiss was granted to the German alpine troops for their bravery. Today, it is still the insignia of the Austrian, French, Slovenian, Polish, Romanian, and German alpine troops.
 In the Swiss Army, the highest ranks (brigadier general and higher) have badges in the form of edelweiss flowers, where other military branch badges would have stars.

World Wars
 The song Stelutis alpinis (Friulian for "alpine edelweiss"), written by Arturo Zardini when he was an evacuee due to World War I, is now considered the unofficial anthem of Friuli
 The soldiers of the Austro-Hungarian army named a position right next to the Valparola Pass as the "Edelweiss position" during World War I.
 The song  was written by Herms Niel for soldiers during World War II
 The edelweiss was a badge of the Edelweiss Pirates, anti-Nazi youth groups in the Third Reich, and was worn on clothes (such as a blouse or a suit).
 The edelweiss was the symbol of Wehrmacht and Waffen-SS Gebirgsjäger, or mountain rangers worn as a metal pin on the left side of the mountain cap, on the band of the service dress cap, and as a patch on the right sleeve. It is still the symbol of the mountain brigade in the German Army.
 The World War II Luftwaffe unit  (51st Bomber Wing) was known as the Edelweiss Wing.
 Operation "Edelweiss" was a project of the US Office of Strategic Services to get information about Hitler's Alpine Fortress in 1945.

After 1945
 The edelweiss is worn by troops in the 1st Battalion of the United States Army's 10th Special Forces Group, who adopted the symbol under the command of Colonel Aaron Bank after it had occupied a Waffen SS officer school (Junkerschule) at Flint Kaserne.
 A song, "Edelweiss", was written for Rodgers and Hammerstein's musical The Sound of Music (1959).
 Since 2002, the Austrian 2 euro cent coin has depicted an edelweiss. From 1959 to 2001, the one-schilling coin depicted a bunch of three flowers.
 It is the symbol of the Bulgarian Tourist Union and the Bulgarian Mountain Control and Lifeguard Service.
 It is also the symbol of the Swiss national tourism organisation.
 It is featured on the Romanian fifty-lei note.
 An Austrian brand of beer is Edelweiß.
 The edelweiss is used in the logotypes of several alpine clubs such as the Deutscher Alpenverein (German Alpine Club), the Österreichischer Alpenverein (Austrian Alpine Club), the Societá Alpina Friulana (Friulian Alpine Club)  or the Alpenverein Südtirol (South Tyrol Alpine Club). The edelweiss is also used in the logotype of the Union of International Mountain Leader Associations (UIMLA).
 The Südtiroler Volkspartei (South Tyrolean People's Party) uses the flower as its logo.
 In Asterix in Switzerland (1970), the plot is driven by a quest to find edelweiss in the Swiss mountains and bring a bloom back to Gaul to cure a poisoned Roman quaestor.
 Edelweiss Air, an international airline based in Switzerland, is named after the flower, which also appears in its logo.
 The musician Moondog composed the song "High on a Rocky Ledge," inspired by the Edelweiss flower.
 "Bring me Edelweiss" is the best-known song of the music group Edelweiss.
 Polish professional ice hockey team MMKS Podhale Nowy Targ uses an edelweiss as its emblem.
 Edelweiss Lodge and Resort is a military resort located in Garmisch, Germany.
 The song La Belle Fleur Sauvage by Lord Huron has lyrics inspired by the tradition of presenting a loved one with an edelweiss.
 In the 7th instalment of the Dark Parables franchise, the Snow Edelweiss flower is revealed to be the flower associated with the Snow Queen, Snow White, the counterpart to her fraternal twin brother, Prince Ross Red of the Fiery Rosa flower.
 In HBO's 2001 mini series Band of Brothers, edelweiss is found on a dead German soldier's uniform. When asked about this, Captain Lewis Nixon replied, "That's edelweiss. It grows in the mountains, above the treeline. Which means he climbed up there to get it. Supposed to be the mark of a true soldier."
In the Korean drama Crash Landing on You, Ri Jyeong Hyuk gives Yoon Se-ri a potted edelweiss. He later asks her to meet him "where the edelweiss grows", referring to the Jungfrau region where they later meet again.
Edelweiss is used as a symbol by 10th Mountain Assault Brigade of the Ukrainian Armed Forces. In February 2023 the brigade was granted the honorific "Edelweiss" by President Volodymyr Zelenskyy.
After Lithuania regained its independence, children of German descent living in Lithuania formed the Edelweiss community, later renamed the Edelweiss-Wolfskinder (Wolf children).

Gallery

See also
 Flora of the Alps
 Golden age of alpinism

References

External links

nivale
Flora of Europe
Alpine flora
Flora of the Alps
Subshrubs
Taxobox binomials not recognized by IUCN
Flora of the Carpathians